Netru Indru Naalai  is a 2008 Indian Tamil-language film produced by Nukarapu Surya Prakasa Rao and directed by Lakshmikant Chenna. The film stars Ravi Krishna and Akshara. It is made on SPR Entertainments India Private Limited Banner. The music was composed by Anil, and the film released on 9 October 2008. The  film was simultaneously made in Telugu as Ninna Nedu Repu.

Plot
A dejected youth Vetri / Vijay (Ravi Krishna) decides to end his life on a railway track. On the tracks, he sees the dead body of a youth called Kishore and takes away his mobile phone. The call he attends over the phone brings him fortune. He gets richer, and money starts coming to him from all quarters.  Fate takes a different turn. A baddie in the city, Moddu Poorana (Ajay), calls up and threatens Vetri / Vijay. On other hand, a new girl named Swapna (Akshara), who knew Kishore but never met him, also enters Vetri / Vijay's life. How Vetri / Vijay manages to put together the pieces of his new life and escape from the deadly goons forms rest of the story.

Cast
Ravi Krishna as  Vetri (Tamil) / Vijay (Telugu) 
Akshara as Swapna
Nassar
Ajay as Moddu Poorana
Karunas (Tamil) / Venu Madhav (Telugu)
Brahmanandam 
Soumya Bollapragada
Tamannaah (special appearance)

Soundtrack
The music was composed by Anil R. and released by Aditya Music.

Tamil tracklist
"Kase" - Ranjith, Nithin
"Netru Indru" - Deepu
"Oru Naalo" - Ranjith
"Aasai" - Priya, Sayonara
"Ethetho" - Gowtham

Telugu tracklist

Reception
The Times of India wrote "A couple of minuses like that, however, doesn't stop the film from being moderately entertaining". Behindwoods wrote "Netru Indru Naalai seems like a mish mash of many Tamil movies (old and new) cooked in excessively greasy gravy of crude dialogues and a story of loser-hero-stumbling-upon-his-fortune-accidentally." Indiaglitz wrote "The credit goes in entirety to director Lakshmikanth, who has managed to infuse all ingredients that would appease action-buffs, at the same time will lure youngsters to the cinema halls."

References

External links

2008 films
2000s Tamil-language films
2000s Telugu-language films
Indian multilingual films
2008 multilingual films